Flight 601 may refer to:

Eastern Airlines Flight 601, crashed on 19 July 1951
Thai Airways International Flight 601, crashed 30 June 1967
Aeroflot Flight 601, crashed on 24 December 1983
Sita Air Flight 601, crashed on 28 September 2012

0601